Idiopterus is a genus of aphid insect. The type species is Idiopterus nephrelepidis.

Notes

Sternorrhyncha genera
Macrosiphini